Bruiser is the third studio album by English band The Duke Spirit. It was released in 2011 and was produced and mixed by Andrew Scheps. "Everybody's Under Your Spell" had previously been released as the lead track of the band's Kusama EP from 2010, and "Surrender" and "Don't Wait" were released as singles with accompanying music videos. "Surrender" is featured in the soundtrack of the 2012 video game Forza Horizon, on the in-game radio station "Horizon Rocks".

Track listing

Critical reception
According to Metacritic, Bruiser received generally favourable reviews from critics.

Personnel
The Duke Spirit
Liela Moss - vocals, piano, harmonica, percussion
Luke Ford - guitar, piano, organ
Olly Betts - drums, percussion, piano, organ, glockenspiel, guitar
Toby Butler - guitar, bass, organ, piano
Marc Sallis - bass

Additional musicians
Andrew Scheps - organ on "Villain"
Rich File - omnichord on "Surrender"

Additional technical personnel
Andrew Scheps - production, mixing
Rich File - production on "Procession", "Surrender", "De Lux" and "Running Fire"
Ian Davenport - Oxford session engineering
Alan Moulder - mixing on "Procession"
Catherine Marks - mixing on "Bodies"

References

The Duke Spirit albums
2011 albums